The Glasspar boat-building company was started in 1947 when Bill Tritt began building small fiberglass boat hulls in his Costa Mesa, California fiberglass shop.

Origins
Bill Tritt had a keen interest in boats and cars before World War II, when he studied marine architecture and boat-building at California State Teacher's College in Santa Barbara, California. He worked for Douglas Aircraft's Production Planning and Illustration Departments during WWII, and by 1945 had built a number of catamaran sailboats. In 1947, John Green, a yachtsman friend, paid Tritt to design and build a racing sailboat in the  range. Fiberglass seemed the logical construction material, and Otto Bayer of Wizard Boats was enlisted as laminator. The boat was named the Green Dolphin, and four were built in various lengths. This was Tritt's first effort in fiberglass-reinforced plastic (FRP). By 1948 he was building small fiberglass sailing dinghies, and built the first ever fiberglass masts and spars for sailboats. This company became the Glasspar Company and moved to larger quarters from Industrial Way in Costa Mesa to Harbor Blvd in Costa Mesa, California, in 1950. By 1951, Glasspar moved again to larger quarters in Santa Ana, California. By the mid-1950s, Glasspar was producing 15 to 20 percent of all fiberglass boats sold in the U.S. By 1958, branch factories were operating in Nashville, Tennessee, Petersburg, Virginia, Olympia, Washington, and Sherman, Texas.

Products
Glasspar built boats in ranges from car toppers to  models and everything in between. Just prior to 1969, when Glasspar was sold off, there were even  oceangoing models. Boats were often given Mediterranean-sounding names, and the boat classes within the model were often indicated by a model type then model name, with a hyphen in between. For example, in the  range there was a model called the Lido, which came in three configurations: the Sport-Lido, Club-Lido, and Lido (standard). Another line, called the Mariner, included the Sport-Mariner, Club-Mariner, or Mariner (standard) model. Some boat models were also named for areas in and around Southern California, such as Avalon on the island of Catalina and Del Mar, a coastal community north of San Diego.

Models included, but were not limited to;
  Sea Lion, a 12' runabout
  Sears and Roebuck car-topper (developed and built for Sears)
  Wing boats for Mantz Aircraft – carried under the wings of converted Navy PBYs
  Dincat, a 12' sailing dinghy with FG mast
  Dinkitten, an 8' sailing dinghy and popular yacht tender with FG mast
  Privateer, a 20' cat-ketch rigged sailboat with unstayed fiberglass masts
 Balboa – a  car-topper
 Superlight – a 10-foot car-topper
 Marathon – an under- runabout
 Lido Series – a-14-foot runabout  
 Citation – a  runabout
 Avalon – a 16-foot runabout
 Seafair Series – a  cruising class
 Flying V-175 – a  cruising class
 del Mar – a  cabin cruiser
 Tacoma – an under- runabout
 Ventura – a  fishing cabin cruiser
 Meridian 21 – a 21-foot fishing cabin cruiser similar to the Ventura
 Meridian 25 – a  ocean fishing boat. There was a limited quantity, and a restoration project is currently underway by the Official Glasspar Owners Association.
  30 Footer – A 30-foot flying bridge cabin cruiser that never saw production. It was designed and built at the Glasspar R&D department by Bill Tritt prior to his leaving the company in 1960. The boards short-sighted decision to not build this model, along with aircraft parts and the entire automotive line, was the reason Tritt resigned from his own company.

Automotive Forays

Glasspar was also one of the first companies to build fiberglass-bodied cars, most notably the G2 (Glasspar), but including the Woodill Wildfire, the Studebaker-based Ascot and the Volvo Sport. The G2 was a prime influence on the decision for Chevrolet to develop the Corvette.

End and legacy
The company was eventually sold to Larson Boat Works.

Restoring and preserving Glasspar boats and cars has become extremely popular in recent years. The official Glasspar Owners Association can be found at Classic Glasspars

Extensive information can be found at the Owners Association Website to include factory brochures, production data and even patents.

American boat builders
Companies based in Santa Ana, California
Costa Mesa, California